Madaglyphus is a genus of mites in the family Acaridae.

Species
 Madaglyphus chaetolamina (C. A. Ferguson, 1985)
 Madaglyphus javensis Haines & Lynch, 1987
 Madaglyphus legendrei A. Fain, 1971

References

Acaridae